Valery Alekseyev may refer to:
Valery Alekseyev (anthropologist) (1929–1991), Soviet Russian anthropologist
Valery Alekseyev (yachtsman), Soviet yachtsman who participated in the 1989–90 Whitbread Round the World Race
Valery Alekseyev (footballer) (born 1979), Russian footballer
Valery Alexeev (mathematician)